The U.S. National Ice Center (USNIC) is a tri-agency operational center whose mission is to provide worldwide navigational ice analyses for the armed forces of the United States, allied nations, and U.S. government agencies.

It is represented by the United States Navy (Department of Defense); the National Oceanic and Atmospheric Administration (Department of Commerce); and the United States Coast Guard (Department of Homeland Security). The U.S. National Ice Center is a subordinate command of the Naval Oceanographic Office (NAVOCEANO). Originally known as the Navy/NOAA Joint Ice Center, which was established on December 15, 1976 in a memorandum of agreement between the U.S. Navy and NOAA, the National Ice Center was formed in 1995 when the U.S. Coast Guard became a partner. The U.S. National Ice Center produces global sea ice charts and various cryospheric GIS products.

Icebergs must be a minimum of 19 kilometers in length to be tracked by the USNIC.

See also 

 International Ice Charting Working Group
 International Ice Patrol

References

External links 
 National Ice Center website
 Twitter account of US NIC

United States Coast Guard
National Oceanic and Atmospheric Administration
United States Navy
Government agencies established in 1995
Ice in transportation
1995 establishments in the United States